Vasil "Vasko" Gunev (born 12 May 1965) is a Macedonian retired footballer.

Club career
Born in Prilep, SR Macedonia, back then within Yugoslavia, Gunev started playing in the local team FK Pobeda having played back then in the Yugoslav Second League.  He became a prolific striker and in 1988 Serbian side FK Napredak Kruševac, playing in the Yugoslav First League, brought him. Despite Gunev's 10 goals, Napredak finished the season in relegation zone and thus played the next season in the Second League. In 1990 Gunev joined Macedonian side FK Vardar also playing in Second League. In the season 1991–92 Yugoslavia started breaking-up and Vardar was promoted. Gunev was Vardar's top-scorer that season with 8 goals. Gunev then returned to Napredak and played in the 1992–93 First League of FR Yugoslavia having scored 7 goals in the league that season. Gunev was referred to at the 68th anniversary of Napredak as one of the most prolific strikers in the history of the club.

In summer 1993 he moves to Cyprus and plays two seasons there, he only played one UEFA Cup game for APOEL FC against Bangor and then proceeded playing with newly-promoted Omonia Aradippou.

References

1965 births
Living people
Sportspeople from Prilep
Association football forwards
Yugoslav footballers
Macedonian footballers
FK Pobeda players
FK Tikvesh players
FK Napredak Kruševac players
FK Vardar players
APOEL FC players
Omonia Aradippou players
Yugoslav First League players
Yugoslav Second League players
First League of Serbia and Montenegro players
Cypriot First Division players
Segunda Divisão players
Macedonian expatriate footballers
Expatriate footballers in Serbia and Montenegro
Macedonian expatriate sportspeople in Serbia and Montenegro
Expatriate footballers in Cyprus
Macedonian expatriate sportspeople in Cyprus
Expatriate footballers in Portugal
Macedonian expatriate sportspeople in Portugal